Linochora is a genus of fungi in the family Phyllachoraceae.

A genus with many species mostly causing leaf spots on grasses.

During the early stages of the formation of tarspots on maize leaves, pycnidia (asexual fruiting body) of the anamorph (asexual reproductive stage) of Phyllachora maydis, Linochora sp., have been occasionally be observed.

Distribution
It has a scattered cosmopolitan distribution, from Europe, Africa, South America and New Zealand.

Species
As accepted by Species Fungorum;

Linochora aberrans 
Linochora acaciae 
Linochora annonae 
Linochora arechavaletae 
Linochora bulbosa 
Linochora conformis 
Linochora costaricensis 
Linochora cynodontis 
Linochora doidgeae 
Linochora howardii 
Linochora laboriosa 
Linochora lasiuri 
Linochora ligniaria 
Linochora longispora 
Linochora macrospora 
Linochora nigrimacula 
Linochora nitens 
Linochora patula 
Linochora polyadelpha 
Linochora qualeae 
Linochora rhododendri 
Linochora rubefaciens 
Linochora sapindacearum 
Linochora verbesinae 

Former species;
 L. advena  = Phyllachora advena, Phyllachoraceae
 L. balansae  = Telimena balansae, Telimenaceae
 L. biformis  = Septoriella biformis, Dothideomycetes
 L. buchenaviae  = Phyllachora buchenaviae, Phyllachoraceae
 L. caricinella  = Septoria caricinella, Mycosphaerellaceae
 L. galophila  = Ophiodothella galophila, Phyllachoraceae
 L. graminis  = Leptostromella graminis, Ascomycota
 L. lagerheimii  = Phyllachora araliae, Phyllachoraceae
 L. leptospermi  = Phyllachora leptospermi, Phyllachoraceae
 L. macularum  = Phyllachora macularum, Phyllachoraceae
 L. phyllachoroidea  = Melophia phyllachoroidea, Ascomycota
 L. ruprechtiae  = Ophiodothella ruprechtiae, Phyllachoraceae
 L. samanensis  = Phyllachora samanensis, Phyllachoraceae
 L. stigmodes  = Phyllachora stigmodes, Phyllachoraceae
 L. tetrica  = Ophiodothella panamensis, Phyllachoraceae
 L. viticis  = Phyllachora taruma, Phyllachoraceae

References

External links
Index Fungorum

Sordariomycetes genera
Phyllachorales